Kelly Hall-Tompkins is a professional violinist and the founder of Music Kitchen-Food for the Soul, a program that lifts the spirits of homeless New Yorkers through live classical music recitals. She has performed as "The Fiddler", as a violin soloist, in the Grammy and Tony-nominated Broadway revival production of Fiddler on the Roof. Hall-Tompkins has appeared as a soloist with orchestras including the Dallas Symphony, Oakland Symphony, Jacksonville Symphony, Tulsa Philharmonic, Chamber Orchestra of New York, and a Brevard Festival Orchestra under the baton of Keith Lockhart, in addition to numerous concerts and recitals in cities around the world." In late 2020, Tompkins was featured in the PBS Great Performances Documentary on Fiddler: A Miracle of Miracles.

Education 
Hall-Tompkins attended Wade Hampton High School in Varnville, South Carolina and the Fine Arts Center of Greenville, South Carolina, where she studied under the instruction of Lenny Schranze and Jon Grier. She continued her studies at the Eastman School of Music in Rochester, New York. She later completed her graduate degree at the Manhattan School of Music in New York, New York. In May 2016, Tompkins received her Honorary Doctorate of Musical Arts from the Manhattan School of Music.

Career

Performances and music career 
Hall-Tompkins has performed at many venues with many different symphonies in her career as a violinist. She has appeared as a co-soloist in Carnegie Hall with Glenn Dicterow and conductor Leonard Slatkin, and in London at Queen Elizabeth Hall, at Lincoln Center. She has performed with Dallas, Jacksonville, and Oakland Symphonies. She has given recitals in Paris, New York, Toronto, Washington, Chicago, and Santa Fe as well as the Tanglewood Festival and the Ravinia festival. Outside the United States, she has also performed in  France, Germany, and Italy." In 2015 and 2016, she won performed as The Fiddler in the 50th anniversary Broadway revival of Fiddler on the Roof. This led to the release of her CD "The Fiddler Expanding Tradition" in 2018, her second CD. The first, titled "In My Own Voice - Music for Violin and Piano with Harp" was released in 2008. After playing the role of "the fiddler" in the revival of Fiddler on the Roof, Tompkins was inspired to write and release the first ever Fiddler solo album, which would be titled The Fiddler: Expanding Tradition. In 2020, Tompkins was selected for the first cohort of WQXR's Artist propulsion lab, a grant program that supports early and mid-career musicians in New York City.

Music Kitchen-Food for the Soul 
Hall-Tompkins founded Music Kitchen — Food for the Soul in 2005. Music Kitchen is a program that lifts the spirits of homeless New Yorkers through live classical music recitals." By 2020, Music Kitchen had brought top artists to perform in over 100 concerts in various homeless shelters throughout the United States.

Awards and features 
Hall-Tompkins has won a Naumburg International Violin Competition Honorarium Prize as well as a Concert Artists Guild Career Grant. She has also been featured in the Smithsonian Museum for African-American History. The 50th anniversary Broadway Revival of Fiddler on the Roof, of which Hall-Tompkins was an integral part, received both Grammy and Tony nominations in 2016.

References

External links 
 Kelly Hall-Tompkins at YouTube

American violinists
Women violinists
Year of birth missing (living people)
Living people